Qarah Baghlar (also Romanized as Qarah Bāghlār, Qarah Bāghlar, and Qareh Bāghlār) is a village in Dasht Rural District, in the Central District of Meshgin Shahr County, Ardabil Province, Iran. At the 2006 census, its population was 454, in 102 families.

References 

Towns and villages in Meshgin Shahr County